Winfield Kirkpatrick Denton (October 28, 1896 – November 2, 1971) was an American lawyer, military veteran, and politician who served several terms as a U.S. Representative from Indiana in the mid-20th century. He was the son of George Kirkpatrick Denton.

Biography
Born in Evansville, Indiana, Denton attended the public schools.
He attended De Pauw University, Greencastle, Indiana.
A.B., De Pauw University, 1919.
J.D., Harvard Law School, Cambridge, Massachusetts, 1922.
He was in the United States Army Air Corps in 1919 during World War I in 1919. He was in the United States Army from 1942 to 1945 during World War II and became a lieutenant colonel.

He was a lawyer in private practice. He served as prosecuting attorney, Vanderburgh County, Indiana from 1932 to 1936. He served as member of the Indiana state legislature from 1937 to 1942, and as minority leader, 1941. He served as member of the Indiana state budget committee from 1940 to 1942.

Congress
Denton was elected as a Democrat to the Eighty-first and to the succeeding Congress (January 3, 1949 – January 3, 1953). He was an unsuccessful candidate for reelection to the Eighty-third Congress in 1952. He served as delegate to each Democratic National Convention, 1952 to 1964.

Denton was elected to the Eighty-fourth and to the five succeeding Congresses and served until his resignation on December 30, 1966 (January 3, 1955 – December 30, 1966). He was an unsuccessful candidate for reelection to the Ninetieth Congress in 1966.

Death 
He died on November 2, 1971, in Evansville, Indiana. He was interred in Oak Hill Cemetery.

References

1896 births
1971 deaths
DePauw University alumni
Harvard Law School alumni
United States Army Air Service pilots of World War I
Democratic Party members of the Indiana House of Representatives
United States Army officers
Democratic Party members of the United States House of Representatives from Indiana
Politicians from Evansville, Indiana
20th-century American politicians
Burials in Indiana